is a railway station in Yakumo, Futami District, Hokkaidō Prefecture, Japan.

Lines
Hokkaido Railway Company
Hakodate Main Line Station H51

Surrounding area
  National Route 5
 Kuroiwa Post Office
 Kuroiwa Elematary School
 Kuroiwa Junior Highschool
 Hakodate Bus "Kuroiwa Eki-mae" Bus Stop

Adjacent stations

Railway stations in Japan opened in 1903
Railway stations in Hokkaido Prefecture
Yakumo, Hokkaido